Lise Morjé Howard is a political scientist from the United States (U.S.),  an expert on United Nations peacekeeping, conflict resolution, civil wars, and American foreign policy. She is currently a Professor of Government and Foreign Service at Georgetown University and President of the Academic Council on the United Nations System (ACUNS).

Career 

She completed her undergraduate studies at Barnard College, spending a semester abroad  in 1990 at Leningrad State University in the former Union of Soviet Socialist Republics (USSR). After graduating from Barnard, she returned to Leningrad State University to study Soviet constitutional law from 1991-1992, witnessing the USSR's dissolution. From 1992-1995, she worked for the New York City Commission for the United Nations, managing an initiative that raised millions of dollars to retain UNICEF's headquarters in the city. In 1995 and 2001, respectively, she obtained her M.A. and Ph.D. from the University of California at Berkeley. Her doctoral dissertation,  "Learning to Keep the Peace?  UN Multidimensional Peacekeeping in Civil Wars",  advised by Ernst B. Haas, focused on the reasons behind the success and failure of UN peacekeeping operations.

From 2002-2004, she was an Assistant Professor of Government at Wesleyan University. Since 2003, she has worked at Georgetown University as Visiting Assistant Professor (2003-2008), Founding Director of the Master's Program in Conflict Resolution (2004-2008), Assistant Professor of Government (2008-2012), International Relations Field Chair for the Department of Government (2015-2016, 2017-2019), and as a tenured Associate Professor of Government and Foreign Service (2012–present). She has also held fellowships at Stanford (CISAC), Harvard (Belfer Center), the University of Maryland (CIDCM), and the U.S. Institute of Peace. She has served as President of ACUNS since 2020.

Her research and teaching focuses is in the fields of international relations, comparative politics, and conflict resolution. She has published articles about peacekeeping, civil war termination, and American foreign policy. Her 2008 book, UN Peacekeeping in Civil Wars (Cambridge University Press, 2008), won the 2010 Book Award from the Friends of the Academic Council on the UN System for the best book on the UN system published in the previous three years. Her recent articles have examined historical changes to the ways that civil wars end as well as on the use of force in UN peacekeeping. Her 2019 book, Power in Peacekeeping (Cambridge University Press, 2019), explores the various tools peacekeepers use to exert power and realize the objectives of their missions. In 2018, she delivered a TedX Georgetown talk on UN peacekeeping.

Publications

Books 
 Power in Peacekeeping. Cambridge: Cambridge University Press, 2019.
 UN Peacekeeping in Civil Wars. Cambridge: Cambridge University Press, 2008. (Review )

Articles 
 “The Use of Force in UN Peacekeeping.” With Anjali Dayal. International Organization. 72 (1) 2018: 71-103.
 “How Civil Wars End: The International System, Norms, and the Role of External Actors.” With Alexandra Stark. International Security. 42 (3) 2017-18: 127-171.
 “Why Civil Wars Are Lasting Longer.” Foreign Affairs. February 27, 2018.
 “U.S. Foreign Policy Habits in Ethnic Conflict.” International Studies Quarterly. 59 (4) 2016: 721-734.
 “Peacekeeping, Peace Enforcement, and UN Reform.” Georgetown Journal of International Affairs. 16 (2) 2015: 6-13.
 “Kosovo and Timor Leste: Neotrusteeship, Neighbors, and the United Nations.” Annals of the American Academy of Political and Social Science. 656 (1) 2014: 116-135.
 “The Ethnocracy Trap.” Journal of Democracy. 23 (4) 2012: 155-169.
 “Sources of Change in US-UN Relations.” Global Governance. 16 (4) 2010: 485-503.
 “Pitfalls and Prospects in the Peacekeeping Literature.” With V. Page Fortna. Annual Review of Political Science. 11 2008: 283-301.
 “UN Peace Implementation in Namibia: The Causes of Success.”  International Peacekeeping. 9 (1) 2002: 99-132.

References

External links 

Year of birth missing (living people)
Living people
American women political scientists
American political scientists
Georgetown University faculty
Barnard College alumni
University of California, Berkeley alumni
American women academics
21st-century American women